Cedar Creek is a stream in Bourbon County, Kansas, in the United States.
It is a tributary of the Marmaton River.
 
Cedar Creek was named from the groves of red cedar in the area.

See also
List of rivers of Kansas

References

Rivers of Bourbon County, Kansas
Rivers of Kansas